Highland Springs is a rural unincorporated community in northwest Barren County, Kentucky, United States.

Geography
Highland Springs is located near the junction of Kentucky Routes 70 and 255 just outside of the eastern boundary of Mammoth Cave National Park.

Education
Students in the community attend the institutions of the Caverna Independent School District in nearby Cave City and Horse Cave.

References

Unincorporated communities in Barren County, Kentucky
Unincorporated communities in Kentucky